Apollinaire Joachim Kyélem de Tambèla (born 1955) is a Burkinabé lawyer, writer and statesman.

Career 
On 21 October 2022, he was appointed Interim Prime Minister by Interim President Ibrahim Traoré.

References 

1955 births
Living people
Prime Ministers of Burkina Faso
Burkinabé lawyers
Burkinabé writers
21st-century Burkinabé people
People from Plateau-Central Region